See Tajpuri for namesakes

Tajpuri is a town and former minor princely state in Gujarat, western India.

History 
The Sixth Class state in Mahi Kantha, comprising seven more villages and seven square miles areas was part of Sabar Kantha Thana and ruled by Kahatriya Parmar Koli shareholder Chieftains.

In 1901 it had a combined population of 1,574, yielding a state revenue of 4,090 Rupees (1903-4, mostly from land), paying two tributes: 600 Rupees tribute to the Gaekwar Baroda State and 186 Rupees to Idar State.

External links and Sources 
 Imperial Gazetteer on dsal.uchicago.edu - Mahi Kantha

See also 
 Tejpura (disambiguation)

References

Princely states of Gujarat
Koli princely states